Angelos Sikalias (born 10 November 1989) is a professional Greek football player.

He started his career with Ilioupoli, where he made a total of 39 league appearances in the Beta and Gamma Ethniki championships. On 8 July 2011, he signed for current club Doxa Drama.

References

External links

1989 births
Living people
Doxa Drama F.C. players
Ilioupoli F.C. players
Super League Greece players
Association football fullbacks
Footballers from Athens
Greek footballers